Volleyball was one of the many sports which was held at the 1998 Asian Games in Bangkok, Thailand.

Schedule

Medalists

Medal table

Draw
The teams were seeded based on their final ranking at the 1994 Asian Games.

Men

Pool A
  (Host)
  (3)
 
 
 *
 

Pool B
  (1)
  (2)
 
 *

Women

Pool A
  (Host)
  (3)
 
 *

Pool B
  (1)
  (2)
 
 *

* Withdrew.

Final standing

Men

Women

References
 Men's Results
 Women's Results

 
1998 Asian Games events
1998
Asian Games
Asian Games